Mạc Đức Việt Anh (born 22 August 1997) is a Vietnamese footballer who plays as a defender for Phố Hiến, on loan from SHB Đà Nẵng.

References 

1997 births
Living people
Vietnamese footballers
Association football defenders
V.League 1 players
Than Quang Ninh FC players
SHB Da Nang FC players